Cethosia luzonica , the Luzon lacewing, is a species of heliconiine butterfly endemic to the Philippines.

Subspecies
C. l. luzonica (Philippines: Luzon)
C. l. pariana Semper, 1888 (Philippines: Panay, Negros, Guimaras)
C. l. boholica Semper, 1888 (Philippines: Bohol, Leyte, Samar, Cebu, Panaon)
C. l. magindanica Semper, 1888 (Philippines: Mindanao)

References

Heliconiini
Butterflies described in 1863
Butterflies of Asia
Taxa named by Baron Cajetan von Felder
Taxa named by Rudolf Felder